Age and Ageing is a bimonthly peer-reviewed medical journal covering all aspects of geriatric medicine and gerontology. It was established in 1972 and is published by Oxford University Press. It is the official journal of the British Geriatrics Society and the editor-in-chief is Rowan Harwood (University of Nottingham).

Abstracting and indexing
The journal is abstracted and indexed in CINAHL, EMBASE, Science Citation Index, Scopus, and MEDLINE/PubMed. According to the Journal Citation Reports, the journal has a 2020 impact factor of 10.668.

Editors-in-chief
The following persons have been editor-in-chief of the journal:
 A. N. Exton-Smith and H. M. Hodkinson (1972–1985)
 H. M. Hodkinson (1986–1987)
 J. Grimley Evans (1988–1995) 
 G. P. Mulley (1996–2001)
 G. K. Wilcock (2002–2007)
 R. M. Francis (2007–2014)
 David J. Stott (2014-2019
 Rowan Harwood (2019–present)

References

External links

Bimonthly journals
English-language journals
Gerontology journals
Oxford University Press academic journals
Publications established in 1972